Greek–Icelandic relations are foreign, economic and cultural relations between Greece and Iceland.  Greece is represented in Iceland through its embassy in Oslo (Norway) and through an honorary consulate in Reykjavík. Iceland is represented in Greece through its embassy in Oslo (Norway) and through an honorary consulate in Athens.  They have been firm allies for over 60 years, and have reaffirmed their ties recently at the highest levels of contacts.

Historical context 
Both nations are full members of the OECD, as they have been since 1961.

Recent ties 
The President of Iceland, Ólafur Ragnar Grímsson, visited Athens in September 2001, where he met with President Kostis Stephanopoulos. In a return visit in early July 2006, the new President of Greece, Karolos Papoulias, came to Iceland and met with President Ólafur. Among other subjects, they discussed strengthening the relations between Greece and Iceland, particularly in sectors  such as telecommunications, pharmaceutical, and banking, in addition to natural fishery products imported from Iceland to Greece. Papoulias also met in Reykjavík with the Prime Minister of Iceland Geir Haarde and discussed subjects such as joint cooperation in the economic sector in the Balkans. During this trip the Foreign Minister of Greece Theodoros Kassimis and the Foreign Minister of Iceland Valgerður Sverrisdóttir signed an agreement on the Avoidance of Double Taxation.

On August 28, 2007, Greece and Iceland reaffirmed their long-standing ties at an official meeting between Greek Prime Minister Costas Karamanlis and Icelandic Prime Minister Geir Haarde, "who was on a working visit to Greece." Karamanlis was reported to have said:

The Greek prime minister is interested in Iceland's "many energy reserves."  He specifically thanked "Haarde for Iceland’s backing of Greece on the Macedonia naming dispute."

Trade and investment

In 2008, Iceland directly exported goods worth ISK 288.7 million to Greece and imported goods worth ISK 271.6 million, or about US$3.5 million in both directions at mid-2008 rates.

In 2005, Thor Bjorgolfsson was involved in a controversial attempt to purchase 16% of the shares of Forthnet, a Greek company involved in the  Telecommunications and Internet sectors.

See also 
 Foreign relations of Greece
 Foreign relations of Iceland
 Iceland–EU relations
 Greeks in Iceland
 Icelanders in Greece

References

External links 
 Greek Ministry of Foreign Affairs about the relation with Iceland
   Icelandic Foreign Ministry: its representation in Greece
  Iceland embassy in Oslo (accredited to Greece)

 
Iceland
Greece